Vernizzi is an Italian surname. Notable people with the surname include:

Narciso Vernizzi (1918–2005), Brazilian sports journalist and radio personality
Renato Vernizzi (1904–1972), Italian painter
Rino Vernizzi (born 1946), Italian bassoonist

Italian-language surnames